Lützow's Wild Hunt (German: Lützows wilde verwegene Jagd) is a 1927 German silent war film.

The 1927 German silent war film was directed by Richard Oswald and starring Ernst Rückert, Arthur Wellin and Mary Kid. The film's art direction was by Ernst Stern. It is part of the cycle of Prussian films and portrays the fight of Prussian troops under the command of Ludwig Adolf Wilhelm von Lützow against the French during the Napoleonic Wars, commemorated in the poetry of Theodor Körner.

Cast
 Ernst Rückert as Theodor Körner 
 Arthur Wellin as Major von Lützow 
 Mary Kid as Toni Adamberger, Schauspielerin am Burgtheater 
 Paul Bildt as Napoleon Bonaparte
 Wera Engels as Eleanore Prochaska, ein Bürgermädchen 
 Gerd Briese as Friedrich Wilhelm von Seydlitz 
 Sig Arno as Franz I of Austria  
 Leopold von Ledebur as Johann Wolfgang von Goethe 
 Albert Steinrück as Ludwig van Beethoven
 Friedrich Kühne as Klemens von Metternich 
 Harry Nestor as Friedrich Wilhelm III, King of Prussia 
 Robert Hartberg as Archduke Franz Karl of Austria 
 Carl Zickner as Joseph Fouché 
 Eduard von Winterstein as Gebhard Leberecht von Blücher
 Paul Marx as Hardenberg 
 Eugen Jensen as Freiherr vom Stein 
 Josef Karma as Direktor des Burgtheaters 
 Hugo Döblin as Burgtheaterfaktotum 
 Emil Sondermann as Schmierendirektor 
 Theodor Burghardt

References

Bibliography
 Prawer, S.S. Between Two Worlds: The Jewish Presence in German and Austrian Film, 1910-1933. Berghahn Books, 2005.

External links

1927 films
Films of the Weimar Republic
1927 war films
German silent feature films
German war films
Films directed by Richard Oswald
Films based on poems
Films set in the 1810s
Prussian films
Napoleonic Wars films
German black-and-white films
1920s historical films
German historical films
Depictions of Napoleon on film
Cultural depictions of Charles Maurice de Talleyrand-Périgord
Cultural depictions of Klemens von Metternich
Cultural depictions of Ludwig van Beethoven
Cultural depictions of Johann Wolfgang von Goethe
Films set in the Kingdom of Prussia
1920s German films
1920s German-language films